Avinguda Tibidabo is a station of the Barcelona Metro and is the terminus of FGC-operated line L7 (also known as Línia de Balmes). The station is situated under Carrer de Balmes at Plaça de John F. Kennedy, the former street's junction with the Avinguda Tibidabo and Passeig de Sant Gervasi.

The station was opened in 1954, along with the rest of the branch from the junction at Gràcia station. It has a single terminal track, which ends at a buffer within the station. Just outside the Gràcia end of the station, this track diverges into the twin running tracks of the L7.

A concourse at the terminal end of the station is linked by four lifts or a long stairway to a subsurface ticket hall under Plaça de John F. Kennedy. This has a single entrance, in the centre of the square. Here connection is made with the historic Tramvia Blau, which provides a link to the Funicular del Tibidabo and hence Tibidabo itself. Several bus routes also serve the station.

See also
List of Barcelona Metro stations
List of railway stations in Barcelona

References

External links
 
 Information and photos about the station at Trenscat.com

Barcelona Metro line 7 stations
Transport in Sarrià-Sant Gervasi
Railway stations in Spain opened in 1954